was a lieutenant-general in the Imperial Japanese Army in World War II. He played an important role in the Mukden Incident in 1931 and as Japanese ambassador to the Soviet Union he negotiated the Soviet–Japanese Neutrality Pact in 1941.

Biography

Early military career
Yoshitsugu Tatekawa, born as the third son of a local official named Nozaki Yoshitaka in Niigata city, and was later adopted by another local official, Tatekawa Shuhei, whose surname he took. He went to Niigata Takada Junior High School and graduated from the 13th class of the Imperial Japanese Army Academy, specializing in cavalry. He served as a lieutenant in the Russo-Japanese War, where in January 1905, by direct order of Field Marshal Oyama Iwao, he led a five-man cavalry squadron on a 23-day, 1200 kilometer reconnaissance mission far behind enemy lines in Manchuria. The intelligence gathered was mentioned in dispatches by General Oku Yasukata with proving invaluable intelligence leading to the Japanese victory at the Battle of Mukden.  His exploits were later publicized in a number of novels and in a serialized story for the Shōnen Club youth magazine, and a fictionalized version became a movie..

After the war, he graduated from the 21st class of the Army Staff College in 1909, and worked at various administrative posts within the Imperial Japanese Army General Staff. He was sent as a military attaché to the United Kingdom in November 1911 and to British India in July 1913. he returned to Japan briefly in January 1916, was promoted to major in May and sent back to Europe in August as a military observer embedded with the Royal Army on the front lines during World War I. He returned to Japan in March 1918, and was private secretary to Army Minister Ōshima Ken'ichi from July 1918 to July 1919, when was promoted to lieutenant colonel. Tatekawa was assigned as the official Imperial Japanese Army representative to the Japanese delegation at the League of Nations between July 1920 and December 1922. 

After his return to Japan Tatekawa was assigned command of the IJA 1st Cavalry Regiment in December 1922 and of the IJA 5th Cavalry Regiment from March 1923. He was promoted to colonel in August of the same year. In December 1924, he was made head of the 2nd Bureau, 4th Department (European and American Intelligence Service) of the General Staff. Politically, he was noted for his close ties to General Ugaki Kazushige.

As general
In March 1928, Tatekawa was promoted to major general and became the military liaison to the Embassy of Japan in Beijing. He was appointed head of the Second Bureau (Intelligence) of the General Staff in August 1929, where he was in position to provide information and assistance to then plotters of the March Incident who aimed at making Ugaki Prime Minister. After he was transferred to the First Bureau (Operations) in August 1931, he provided information and aid to Kingoro Hashimoto and Isamu Chō in the abortive coup d'état known as the October incident.  

Tatekawa was dispatched by Army Minister Jirō Minami to Manchuria for the specific purpose of curbing the insubordination and militarist behavior of the Kwantung Army. There was a growing concern by both military and civilian leaders in Tokyo that the Kwantung Army would take unauthorized action to provoke an incident leading to war with China. Tatekawa was sent with a letter from Minami to the commander of the Kwantung Army, Lieutenant General Shigeru Honjō, together with a second letter written by General Kanaya Hanzo, head of the Army General Staff. The Kwantung Army was forewarned of this visit by a message from Tatekawa's assistant, Colonel Kingoro Hashimoto. On arrival, instead of reprimanding the Kwantung Army leaders for their insubordination, Tatekawa said that everything could wait "until tomorrow" and spent his time in a ryōtei until he passed out from a drink. That same night, the Mukden Incident occurred, which provided the pretext for the Japanese invasion of Manchuria.  From Tatekawa's peculiar behavior the previous night, it can be surmised that he was aware of, and supported, the plot and had taken the deliberate decision not to prevent it .

In December 1931, Tatekawa was on the Japanese delegation to the Geneva Disarmament Conference and from July 1932 was the Japanese permanent representative to the League of Nations in Geneva until Japan officially withdrew from the League in March 1933. He was promoted to lieutenant general in August 1932. In March 1933, he was made commander of the IJA 10th Division. He was transferred to command the IJA 4th Division in December 1935.

His military career ended when he was forced to resign from military service in the purge of Kōdōha officers following the February 26 Incident.

Diplomatic career

In September 1940, Tatekawa was appointed as ambassador to the Soviet Union. He played a crucial role during the negotiations of the Soviet-Japanese Neutrality Pact which was signed in Moscow on April 13, 1941. The signing of this treaty occurred on two years after the Soviet-Japan War, and was of vital concern for proponents of the Nanshin-ron southern expansion doctrine within the Japanese government and military, as it enabled more troops to be deployed for the Japanese expansion into southeast Asia.

On the same day, Tatekawa signed a separate treaty in which the Soviet Union pledged to respect the territorial integrity and inviolability of Manchukuo, and in which Japan pledged the same to respect the Soviet hegemony over the People's Republic of Mongolia.

Tatekawa, against orders from the central government, issued visas to many Jews who would likely have been killed during the holocaust.

He remained ambassador until March 1942, when he had to return to Japan due to health problems.  After his return, he served as an official in the Imperial Rule Assistance Association political party and as head of the Yokusan Sonendan paramilitary youth organization from August 1944. He died on September 9, 1945, and was buried at the Tama Cemetery in Fuchū, Tokyo.

In popular media

Literature
The actions and courage of Yoshitsugu Tatekawa in his reconnaissance patrols during the Russo-Japanese War were immortalized in a very popular children's book titled  written by Yamanaka Minetaro (1885-1966) in 1931. It was published in 1936 in the children's magazine Boys' Club (Shonen Kurabu 少年クラブ), published by Kodansha.

Film
The novel written by Yamanaka Minetaro on Tatekawa's exploits in the Russo-Japanese War was later turned into a movie. In 1941, Akira Kurosawa wrote the script for the movie Tekichi Odan Sambyaku-ri (Advance Patrol). The movie went into production in 1957 and was directed by Kazuo Mori. The story takes place in Manchuria in 1905 where Lieutenant Tatekawa together with five soldiers are sent on a reconnaissance mission behind the Russian lines to gather information about their plans. The six find what they seek, but the most difficult part of their mission is to return safely.

Anime
 is a 13 episode Japanese anime which is set in Shanghai and Manchuria in 1931. Episode 7 specifically talks about the Mukden Incident. The anime was broadcast on TV Tokyo starting from April 5, 2010. It was directed by Matsumoto Jun. The anime was released by Sentai Filmworks on Blu-Ray and DVD in August 2011. Because of the political controversy surrounding the Mukden Incident, Episode 7 titled "Jihen" (事変 - The Incident) was only available to watch via online streaming.  It shows the incidents leading up to the Mukden Incident from the point of view of the Japanese officers of the Kwantung Army stationed in Manchuria and the intervention of Yoshitsugu Tatekawa in the incident. In the episode it is shown how the Japanese officers planned the bombardment so Japan could attack Manchuria out of self-defense.

Tatekawa is voiced by Takaya Hashi in Japanese and by Rob Mungle in English.

Timeline

Military Ranks

Professional career

Decorations

References

1880 births
1945 deaths
People from Niigata (city)
Imperial Japanese Army generals of World War II
Japanese military attachés
Japanese generals
Recipients of the Order of the Golden Kite
Grand Cordons of the Order of the Rising Sun
Recipients of the Order of the Sacred Treasure, 2nd class
Japanese military personnel of the Russo-Japanese War
People of the Second Sino-Japanese War
Japanese military personnel of World War I
Japanese military personnel of World War II
Ambassadors of Japan to the Soviet Union
Imperial Rule Assistance Association politicians